Stevns may refer to:
 Stevns Municipality
 Stevns Peninsula

See also
 Stevns Klint, a white chalk cliff on Stevns Peninsula